Kalmia procumbens, commonly known as alpine azalea or trailing azalea, is a dwarf shrub of high mountain regions of the Northern Hemisphere that usually grows no more than  tall. Originally named by Linnaeus as Azalea procumbens, it is also named after French botanist L.L.A. Loiseleur-Deslongchamps - Loiseleuria procumbens.

Distribution
Kalmia procumbens is not well known though it is widely distributed. These plants are common in the subarctic regions and high mountains of the northern hemisphere.  In North America it reaches the southern limit of its range in the mountains of Maine, New Hampshire, New York, and Washington. It is easy to propagate.

Habitat and ecology
Kalmia procumbens prefers alpine or subalpine, rocky exposed habitat. It grows above treeline with mountain heathers and at lower elevations in bogs.

It is a known host to the microfungus Delphinella polyspora, which grows on its pedicels and fruit.

Morphology

Individuals of this species are shrubs grown for two to five rose-pink flowers. Its leaves are opposite and its evergreen leaves are leathery blades to 8mm long and have incised margin. Edges are rolled under green on the top and white with dense short hairs underneath.

Flowers and fruit

Flowers of Kalmia procumbens are bell shaped and five lobed, and have five stamens. The flowering time is late spring and summer.

References

Notes
  Maine Department of Conservation Natural Areas Program: Loiseleuria procumbens (Alpine Azalea) (2004)
 Wiley, L. 1969. Rare wild flowers of North America. pp 308–313.

procumbens
Flora of Canada
Flora of Northern Europe
Flora of the Northeastern United States
Flora of the Northwestern United States
Flora of Alaska
Flora of Maine
Flora of Russia
Flora of Saint Pierre and Miquelon
Taxa named by Carl Linnaeus
Flora without expected TNC conservation status